The Coronation Stone is an ancient sarsen stone block which is believed to have been the site of the coronation of seven Anglo-Saxon kings. It is presently located next to the Guildhall in Kingston upon Thames, England. Kingston is now a town in the Royal Borough of Kingston Upon Thames in Greater London.

Typonymy
In Old English, tun, ton or don meant farmstead or settlement, so the name Kingston appears to mean farmstead of the kings. A local legend that these Saxon coronations gave Kingston its name is contradicted by the records of the 838 council.

History
Æthelstan was consecrated king at Kingston in 925, Eadred in 946 and Æthelred the Unready in 979. There is also some evidence that Edward the Elder, Edmund I, Eadwig and Edward the Martyr were consecrated in the town.

According to John Stow, writing in the late sixteenth century, Æthelstan was crowned on a stage in the market place, but it was later believed that the kings were crowned in the ancient church of St Mary, which collapsed in 1730. A large stone block was recovered soon afterwards from the ruins of the chapel, and it has since been regarded as the "Coronation Stone" of the Kings of the English. It was used for a time in the late 18th century to the early 19th century as a mounting block, but in 1850 it was placed in the market place on a plinth in front of the old Town Hall (on the site now occupied by the 'Market House' today). which had the names of the seven kings believed to have been crowned on it inscribed around the side.

Future plans
In 2017, Kingston Council was considering an option of re-siting the coronation stone from the Guildhall's frontage back to its original location within the churchyard of Kingston's old parish church, All Saints Church.

Notes

Further reading

External links
 

History of the Royal Borough of Kingston upon Thames
Monuments and memorials in London
Grade I listed buildings in the Royal Borough of Kingston upon Thames
English monarchy
Anglo-Saxon archaeology
Coronation stones
Tourist attractions in the Royal Borough of Kingston upon Thames